Strangest Thing or variants may refer to:

"Strangest Thing", by Grant Lee Philips from Hung (television soundtrack)
"Strangest Thing", a song by War on Drugs from A Deeper Understanding
"The Strangest Thing", by George Michael from Older
The Strangest Things album by American indie rock band Longwave 2003  
"Strangest Things", song by Longwave from The Strangest Things